Lorraine Kay Potter (née Fallon; 1946) is a former Chief of Chaplains of the United States Air Force and was the first female chaplain in the United States Air Force.

Biography
A native of Warwick, Rhode Island, Potter is an ordained Baptist minister. She is a graduate of Keuka College, Colgate Rochester Crozer Divinity School and Central Michigan University. Her husband, Robert, is also a former United States Army chaplain, who reached the rank of colonel.

Career
Potter initially inquired about serving as a military chaplain in 1972. She sent a letter to the Chief of Chaplains of the United States Air Force at the time, Roy M. Terry. The response stated that one of the qualifications for a chaplain in the air force was that they had to be male. Several weeks later, she received a letter stating that the Chief of Chaplains had dropped the gender requirement, and that if her church gave her an endorsement, it would be possible for her to become an air force chaplain. She received the endorsement and eventually was commissioned an officer in 1973.

In 1992, while stationed at Bolling Air Force Base, she was promoted to colonel. As was she the first female chaplain to reach that rank, then-Air Force Chief of Staff Merrill McPeak organized a special ceremony at The Pentagon to commemorate the occasion.

From 1994 to 1995, she served as executive director of the Armed Forces Chaplains Board before serving as Command Chaplain of the United States Air Forces in Europe. She also served as Command Chaplain at Headquarters Air Education and Training Command and briefly returned to Bolling Air Force Base before she was named Deputy Chief of Chaplains of the United States Air Force with the rank of brigadier general in 1999. In 2001, she was promoted to Chief of Chaplains with the rank of major general and held that position until her retirement in 2004.

Awards and military decorations

References

People from Warwick, Rhode Island
Female generals of the United States Air Force
Chiefs of Chaplains of the United States Air Force
United States Air Force generals
Baptist ministers from the United States
Recipients of the Legion of Merit
Central Michigan University alumni
Living people
Deputy Chiefs of Chaplains of the United States Air Force
Recipients of the Air Force Distinguished Service Medal
Colgate Rochester Crozer Divinity School alumni
1946 births
Keuka College alumni
21st-century American women